Gunārs Piesis (19 July 1931 – 9 February 1996) was a Latvian film director.

1931 births
1996 deaths
Latvian film directors
Soviet film directors
Film people from Riga